Headin' Home is the sixth solo album by one-time Spooky Tooth keyboard player Gary Wright released in 1979.

Track listing
All songs written by Gary Wright except as noted.

"Keep Love In Your Soul" (Wright, Jamie Quinn) (4:55)
"Love's Awake Inside" (4:35)
"You Don't Own Me" (3:38)
"Moonbeams" (3:32)
"Stand" (3:52)
"I'm The One Who'll Be By Your Side" (Wright, Cristina Wright) (4:14)
"Follow Next To You" (4:35)
"I Can Feel You Cryin'" (4:37)
"Let Me Feel Your Love Again" (2:35)
"Love Is Why" (Wright, Lorna Wright) (4:05)

Personnel
 Gary Wright - Moog synthesizer, Hohner Clavinet, Arp Strings, vocals
 Jai Winding - Arp Strings, Oberheim Horns
 Neil Larson - Oberheim Flute
 Michael Boddicker - Polymoog Strings
 Bobby Lyle - Acoustic Piano, Fender Rhodes electric piano
 Steve Lukather - Guitar
 Roland Bautista - Guitar
 Hugh McCracken - Rhythm Guitar
 Fred Tackett - Rhythm Guitar
 Buzz Feiten - Acoustic Guitar
 Jim Horn - Saxophone
 Michael McDonald - Backing Vocals
 David Crosby - Backing vocals 
 Graham Nash - Backing vocals
 Andy Newmark - Drums
 Jeff Porcaro - Drums
 Alan White - Drums
 Harvey Mason - Drums, Percussion
 Lenny Castro - Percussion
 Paulinho da Costa - Percussion
 Emil Richards - Percussion
 Audie Watkins - Percussion

Production
Producers: Gary Wright
Engineers: John Haeny
Assistant Engineers: Paul Black, John (Michael) Weaver

References

Gary Wright albums
1979 albums
Warner Records albums